Foveran is the name of both a parish and village in Aberdeenshire, Scotland.

The origin of the place-name is from the Scottish Gaelic word fuaran indicating a place with a little spring and appears as Furene in c. 1150.

The hereditary baronetcy of Foveran is held by the Turing family (see Turing Baronets). The cryptographer and computing pioneer Alan Turing (1912–1954) was uncle to the present Baronet.

Notable people
 William Duff, minister and psychologist, born in Foveran.
 Rev John Paterson, minister of Foveran, later Bishop of Ross
 Robert Paterson (d.1717) principal of Marischal College, son of above

References

Villages in Aberdeenshire